Two naval vessels of Japan have been named Katsuragi:

 , the lead ship of that class.

See also

 The , in the late 19th century and early 20th century.

Imperial Japanese Navy ship names

Japanese Navy ship names